Bernard Occelli (born 20 May 1961) is a former rally co-driver from France.

Born in Cannes, Occelli achieved national fame as the co-driver to Didier Auriol with whom he won the 1994 World Rally Championship. Occelli made his debut at the 1983 Monte Carlo Rally with Swiss driver Tycho van Dijk in a Porsche 911. He first paired up with Auriol the following year in a Renault 5 Turbo. They won the title in 1994 in a Toyota Celica Turbo 4WD.

Occelli continued to appear regularly in the championship until 1996.

References

1961 births
French rally co-drivers
Living people
Sportspeople from Cannes
World Rally Championship co-drivers